Beverly Hills Fabulous is an American reality documentary  television series on VH1 that debuted on March 14, 2011, and ran for only one season.

Premise
Beverly Hills Fabulous follows the daily operations of Elgin Charles Salon located in Beverly Hills, California. The salon is owned and operated by the "Emperor of Hair", Elgin Charles.

Cast
 Elgin Charles
 Sean Cameron
 Katrina Atkinson
 Lolita "Lo" Goods

Episodes

References

2010s American reality television series
2011 American television series debuts
2011 American television series endings
English-language television shows
Television shows set in Beverly Hills, California
VH1 original programming